Teonthar is a town and a nagar panchayat in Rewa district in the Indian state of Madhya Pradesh.

History
Teonthar was once ruled by the Kol dynasty kings . Teonthar lies on one of the oldest routes between north India and south India. Teonthar is also known for its Deor kothar (Devanāgarī: देउर कोठार, also Deur Kothar) stupas. These Buddhists stupas are credited to the Mauryan emperor, Ashoka.

Teonthar Garhi 

Baghel kings preceded Adivasi and Velavanshi kings ruled
Teonthar The region has been an important center of dynastic politics since ancient times. From the story of Vijayanth of Bhurishrava of Mahabharata period to the tribal king and Benvanshi kings, the story of Tyonthar is associated with Kolgarhi. But very few people know that Bhurtiya kings also ruled from this Kolgarhi. The Bhurtiya kings ruled here and their administration was run from Kolgarhi only.

Like the confluence of Tyonthar Ganga-Yamuna, it was considered as the safe place of the capital due to being situated at the confluence of river Tamasa and Kharari river as well as being at the foothills of Vindhya mountain. This place was suitable for the local rulers. The area of Tyonthar was ruled by tribal kings prior to the Baghel kings.According to the Kyoti ki Garhi book of historian Ramsagar Shastri, Maharaja Veer Singh of Rewa expanded the kingdom towards the north in the beginning of the 16th century and conquered the area up to Arail Jhunsi Venuvanshiya and conquered small kings. . The Bhurtis also ruled the kingdom of Tyonthar Kol dynasty kings, later the kings of the Bhurtiya dynasty took over. There were many small kingdoms on the sprawling land north of Tyonthar and south of Jhunsi. In which there was the kingdom of the Kolas, somewhere of the Bhuttis. The Venvanshiy rulers of Jhunsi defeated the small Kol and Bhurtiya kings and took control of them and started ruling by making Tyonthar their stronghold.

 Ganpat Shah had built a fort

The fortress of Tyonthar Venvanshi is said to be built by King Ganpat Shah. According to the legend, this fort was owned by the Bhurtiya king before the Venuvanshi king. After being defeated by the Vannuvanshi king, the Bhurtiya king was expelled from Tyonthar. It is said that people of Bhurtiya community in Tyonthar do not like to drink water even today. They believe that where ever they were kings and they were humiliated and expelled from there, then why should they drink water there.

 Do not drink water in Tyonthar

In this context, Dr. BL Bhurtiya, a resident of village Chandai and retired from the post of District Rewa Ayurveda Medical Officer, told that it is true that whenever people belonging to his clan used to go to Tonthar, they crossed the river and used to drink water in Chilla. The Bhurtiya family of Chandai village had thousands of cows earlier. The then prosperity and sociality of the Bhurtiya family shows that certainly their kingdom was once in a while

Geography
It has an average elevation of 151 metres (495 feet). The town is situated on the banks of Tamsa River (also known as the Tons River) which is a tributary of the Ganges . Geographically, a large part of Teonthar is an alluvial plain. The alluvial plains of Teonthar are 100 metres (330 ft) in elevation. Due to its location and elevation, the area around Teonthar is flood prone.

Location and Transportation
Teonthar is located near the state borders of Madhya Pradesh and Uttar Pradesh. It is situated at a distance of about 77 kilometers from Rewa and about 60 kilometers from the city of Allahabad. The town is well connected to both Rewa and Allahabad via National Highway 30 (NH30). Nearest railway stations are Shankargarh, Allahabad and Rewa. Allahabad Airport (Bamrauli) is nearest airport.

Demographics
The town is divided into 15 wards and has a population of 17,039 (8,812 males and 8,227 females) according to 2011 census. 14.65% of total population of Teonthar is below 6 years of age. Sex ratio is 934 and average Literacy rate is 71.99% which is higher than state average of 69.32%. Hindus form 92.82% of the population  whereas Muslims constitute 6.88%.

Transport

By air

Nearest airport in Prayagraj, Uttar Pradesh.

By bus

Bus stand available in the city bus stand Teonthar.

References

Cities and towns in Rewa district